Aabhaas Mehta is an Indian television actor. He started his acting career in 2009 with Bairi Piya that aired on Colors. He played the role of Suren. He rose to fame with his performance as Shyam Manohar Jha in Star Plus' Iss Pyaar Ko Kya Naam Doon.

Early life
Mehta studied law in Pune. He acted in a few short films before he made his debut on TV. Mehta also did an acting course from Anupam Kher's The School of Actors before he got his first show in 2009.

Career
Mehta began his career with Bairi Piya in 2009 (on Colors). He went on to perform roles in shows like Devi (2010 on Imagine), Na Aana Is Des Laado (2011 on Colors), as Shyam Manohar Jha in Iss Pyaar Ko Kya Naam Doon (2011 on Star Plus), as Agasthya in Badalte Rishton Ki Dastaan (2013 on Zee TV), as Betaal in Sinhasan Battisti (2015), and as Yug Shrivastava in Brahmarakshas (2016 on Zee TV). He played the character of Shumbh in Mahakali– Anth hi Aarambh hai (on Colors). Abhaas, also played the role of Dr. Parag in Tu Sooraj Main Saanjh Piyaji (Star Plus).

Commercial diver
In 2015, Mehta joined a commercial diving course in Scotland. He is a certified commercial air diver.

Television

References

External links
 

Living people
Indian male television actors
Male actors from Mumbai
Year of birth missing (living people)
Actors in Hindi cinema